Thomas Bruce Peters (1895–1960) was an Australian rugby league footballer and pioneer player for St. George in the 1920s

Peters was a forward at St. George during the club's early years. He played between 1923–26 and later became a selector for the club in the late 1920s.
Peters was also a veteran on the first world war (14th Field Company Engineers). 

Peters died on 21 September 1960 at his Coogee, New South Wales home.

References

St. George Dragons players
1895 births
1960 deaths
Australian rugby league administrators
Australian rugby league players
Australian military personnel of World War I
Rugby league props
Rugby league second-rows
Rugby league players from Sydney